Vladimir Krstić (born 27 July 1972) is a Croatian professional basketball coach and former player who is the head coach for the Gorica of the Croatian League.

Professional career
Krstić, an Osijek native, started his career in his hometown club Olimpija Osijek. After leaving Osijek, Krstić played for series of clubs all around Europe - Steiner Bayreuth, Cibona Zagreb, Anwil Wloclawek, Pau Orthez, Metis Varese, Lietuvos rytas, KK Zadar, Lianera Menorca, Olimpia Larissa, BC Kyiv, Aigaleo, KK Zagreb and Cedevita Zagreb.

Coaching career
In December 2014, Krstić took over as a head coach of Croatian first division club KK Vrijednosnice Osijek. On 9 January 2019, Krstić and Vrijednosnice parted ways.

In September 2017, he became an assistant coach of Croatia national team in staff of Ivica Skelin. He left the staff in 2019.

On 19 November 2019, Krstić was named the new head coach for Dubrava Furnir of the Croatian League. 

In July 2022, Gorica hired Krstić as their new head coach.

References

External links
Adriatic League Player Profile
Basket-stats Player Profile

1972 births
Living people
ABA League players
Aigaleo B.C. players
BC Kyiv players
BC Rytas players
Croatian basketball coaches
Croatian men's basketball players
Élan Béarnais players
KK Cedevita players
KK Cibona players
KK Split players
KK Włocławek players
KK Zadar players
KK Zagreb players
KK Vrijednosnice Osijek coaches
Liga ACB players
Medi Bayreuth players
Menorca Bàsquet players
Olympia Larissa B.C. players
Pallacanestro Varese players
Point guards
Sportspeople from Osijek
KK Dubrava coaches